The following is a list of notable deaths in January 2018.

Entries for each day are listed alphabetically by surname. A typical entry lists information in the following sequence:
 Name, age, country of citizenship at birth, subsequent country of citizenship (if applicable), reason for notability, cause of death (if known), and reference.

January 2018

1
Gert Brauer, 62, German footballer (Carl Zeiss Jena).
Humberto Coutinho, 71, Brazilian physician and politician, President of the Legislative Assembly of Maranhão (since 2015), Mayor of Caxias (2005–2013), intestinal cancer.
Peter Evans, 88, British musicologist.
Philip Jacobson, 79, English journalist, meningitis.
Milt Jamin, 78, American voice actor (Grand Theft Auto IV, The Big O, The Transformers).
Jahn Otto Johansen, 83, Norwegian journalist.
Robert Mann, 97, American violinist and composer, founding member of the Juilliard String Quartet.
Régis Manon, 52, Gabonese footballer (Tours FC, FC 105 Libreville, Joué-lès-Tours).
Dušan Mitošević, 68, Serbian football player (Radnički Niš, Smederevo, Nîmes) and manager, cancer.
Mick Murphy, 99, Irish hurler.
Ebrahim Nafae, 83, Egyptian journalist, cancer.
Manuel Olivencia, 88, Spanish economist and diplomat, complications from a fall.
Milton P. Rice, 97, American politician, Attorney General of Tennessee (1974).
Mauro Staccioli, 80, Italian sculptor, complications from pneumonia.
Jon Paul Steuer, 33, American actor (Grace Under Fire, Little Giants, Star Trek: The Next Generation) and singer, suicide by gunshot.
Tim Sweeney, 88, Irish hurler (Galway).
Katsuhikari Toshio, 75, Japanese sumo wrestler, bile duct cancer.
Wolfgang Treu, 87, German cinematographer.
Betty Willis, 76, American soul singer, strangled.

2
Dee Ayuba, 31, British-Nigerian basketball player, heart attack.
Małgorzata Bocheńska, 69, Polish journalist.
Frank Buxton, 87, American actor (What's Up, Tiger Lily?), screenwriter and director (The Odd Couple, Happy Days).
Tony Calder, 74, English music promoter and executive (The Beatles, The Rolling Stones), complications from pneumonia.
Donna Carter, 73, Trinidadian politician, Senator, High Commissioner to South Africa.
Alan Deakin, 76, English footballer (Aston Villa, Walsall, Tamworth).
Giovanni Di Clemente, 69, Italian film producer.
Marian Donat, 57, Polish Olympic judoka.
Ronald R. Fieve, 87, American psychiatrist.
Eugène Gerards, 77, Dutch football player and manager (SV Limburgia, Fortuna Sittard, OFI Crete).
Rick Hall, 85, American record producer, songwriter and recording studio owner (FAME Studios), prostate cancer.
Ferdinando Imposimato, 81, Italian judge.
Durahim Jamaluddin, 36, Malaysian footballer, heart attack.
Ali Kadhim, 69, Iraqi Olympic footballer (1980).
Lawal Kaita, 85, Nigerian politician, Governor of Kaduna State (1983).
Jyrgalbek Kalmamatov, 45, Kyrgyz politician, MP (since 2015), heart attack.
Rosa Kavara, 59, Namibian politician.
Guida Maria, 67, Portuguese actress, pancreatic cancer.
Mike McCartney, 63, Scottish footballer (Carlisle United, Plymouth Argyle, Southampton).
Ali Akbar Moinfar, 89, Iranian politician, MP (1980–1984), Minister of Petroleum (1979–1980).
Thomas S. Monson, 90, American religious leader and writer, President of The Church of Jesus Christ of Latter-day Saints (since 2008) and Quorum of the Twelve Apostles (1995–2008).
Armando Monteiro Filho, 92, Brazilian politician, Minister of Agriculture (1961–1962).
Mountain Fiji, 60, American professional wrestler (GLOW).
Michael Pfeiffer, 92, German football player (national team) and manager (Roda JC Kerkrade, Alemannia Aachen).
Felix Reilly, 84, Scottish footballer (Dunfermline Athletic, East Fife).
Sauryavong Savang, 80, Laotian prince.
Željko Senečić, 84, Croatian film and television production designer.
Radha Viswanathan, 83, Indian vocalist, pneumonia.
Lyndon Wainwright, 98, British metrologist, ballroom dancer and author.
Jim Wiste, 70, Canadian ice hockey player (Chicago Blackhawks, Vancouver Canucks).
Betty Woodman, 87, American ceramic artist and sculptor, pneumonia.
Ye Zhemin, 93, Chinese art historian.
Yell Htwe Aung, 24, Burmese comedian and actor, injuries sustained in an assault.

3
Mlungisi Bali, 27, South African rugby union player (Griffons, Border Bulldogs), stabbed.
Donal Barrington, 89, Irish judge, member of the Supreme Court (1996–2000).
Luigi Alberto Bianchi, 73, Italian violinist.
Colin Brumby, 84, Australian composer and conductor.
Valery Chalidze, 79, Russian-born American publisher.
Philip Eden, 66, British meteorologist, broadcaster and author.
Dolly Everett, 14, Australian cyberbullying victim, suicide.
Stanley Hartt, 80, Canadian civil servant, Chief of Staff to the Prime Minister (1989–1990), cancer.
Heriberto Hermes, 84, American Roman Catholic prelate, Bishop of Cristalândia (1990–2009).
Keorapetse Kgositsile, 79, South African poet and journalist.
Aurelio Menéndez, 90, Spanish politician and lawyer, Minister of Education (1976–1977).
Francis George Adeodatus Micallef, 89, Maltese Roman Catholic prelate, Apostolic Vicar of Kuwait (1981–2005).
Miroslav Miletić, 92, Croatian composer.
Darci Miguel Monteiro, 49, Brazilian footballer (Volta Redonda Futebol Clube, Widzew Łódź, Antalyaspor), heart attack.
Rob Picciolo, 64, American baseball player (Oakland Athletics, Milwaukee Brewers) and coach (San Diego Padres), heart attack.
Konrad Ragossnig, 85, Austrian classical guitarist.
Alan Sagner, 97, American public servant and political fundraiser, chairman of Port Authority of New York and New Jersey and the CPB, cardiac amyloidosis.
Medeniyet Shahberdiyeva, 87, Turkmen opera singer and music educator.
Ambalavaner Sivanandan, 94, Sri Lankan author.
Serafino Sprovieri, 87, Italian Roman Catholic prelate, Archbishop of Rossano-Cariati (1980–1991) and Benevento (1991–2006).
Igor Strelbin, 43, Russian footballer (Dynamo Bryansk, FC Dynamo Makhachkala, Zenit Penza).

4
Aharon Appelfeld, 85, Romanian-born Israeli writer.
Ulhas Bapat, 67, Indian santoor player.
Dick Bestwick, 87, American football coach (Virginia Cavaliers).
Nicola Gordon Bowe, 69, British art historian.
Johannes Brost, 71, Swedish actor (Rederiet, Black Jack, Stjärnhuset), throat cancer.
Brendan Byrne, 93, American politician, Governor of New Jersey (1974–1982), lung infection.
Papa Camara, 66, Guinean football player (Hafia) and coach (national team).
Gerard Conley Sr., 88, American politician, member of the Maine Senate (1968–1984) and House of Representatives (1964–1968), Mayor of Portland (1970–1971).
Joaquín Cortizo, 85, Spanish footballer.
Carmen Cozza, 87, American baseball and football player (Miami Redhawks) and Hall of Fame coach (Yale Bulldogs).
Bruce Halle, 87, American auto parts executive and philanthropist, founder of Discount Tire.
Owen Hardy, 95, New Zealand WWII air force pilot.
Lyli Herse, 89, French racing cyclist.
Senichi Hoshino, 70, Japanese Hall of Fame baseball player (Chunichi Dragons) and manager (Hanshin Tigers, Tohoku Rakuten Golden Eagles), pancreatic cancer.
Philipp Jenninger, 85, German politician, President of the Bundestag (1984–1988).
Rafiatou Karimou, 71, Beninese politician and teacher, member of the National Assembly (1999–2006).
Gail McIntosh, 62, New Zealand politician, MP for Lyttelton (1990–1993).
Jack N. Merritt, 87, American army general.
Emerante Morse, 99, Haitian dancer and folklorist.
Raymond Robinson, 88, South African Olympian 
Zubaida Tariq, 72, Pakistani chef, complications from a heart attack.
Ray Thomas, 76, English singer-songwriter ("Veteran Cosmic Rocker", "For My Lady") and Hall of Fame musician (The Moody Blues), prostate cancer.
Geoffrey Vaughan, 84, Australian rugby union player and pharmaceutical scientist.
Vladimir Yankilevsky, 79, Russian artist.

5
Antonio Valentín Angelillo, 80, Italian-Argentine football player (Inter Milan, A.S. Roma, Boca Juniors).
Muntazir Baba, 68, Pakistani poet.
Emanuel Barbara, 68, Maltese Roman Catholic prelate, Bishop of Malindi (since 2011).
Thomas Bopp, 68, American astronomer, co-discoverer of Comet Hale–Bopp, liver failure.
Aydın Boysan, 96, Turkish architect, multiple organ failure.
Rasa Chughtai, 89, Indian-born Pakistani poet.
Carlos Heitor Cony, 91, Brazilian journalist and writer, multiple organ failure.
Robert Q. Crane, 91, American politician, Treasurer and Receiver-General of Massachusetts (1965–1991); member of the Massachusetts House of Representatives (1957–1964).
Donald D. Evans, 90, Canadian philosopher.
Jacques Genest, 98, Canadian physician and scientist.
Carole Hart, 74, American television writer (Sesame Street), cancer.
Bruce Hood, 81, Canadian hockey referee (NHL), prostate cancer.
Henry Jean-Baptiste, 85, French politician, Deputy (1986–2002).
Hans Werner Kettenbach, 89, German journalist and author.
Asghar Khan, 96, Pakistani politician and military officer, Commander-in-Chief of the Air Force (1957–1965).
Marián Labuda, 73, Slovak actor.
Norman Lamb, 82, American politician, member of the Oklahoma Senate (1971–1988).
John McIntyre, 89, American Olympian 
Mick Murphy, 77, Irish hurler (Tipperary).
Dhiraj Kumar Nath, 72, Bangladeshi diplomat, member of the Caretaker government panel.
Livingstone Mpalanyi Nkoyoyo, 80, Ugandan Anglican prelate, Archbishop of Uganda (1995–2004).
Vincent Mojwok Nyiker, 84, Sudanese Roman Catholic prelate, Bishop of Malakal (1979–2009).
Münir Özkul, 92, Turkish actor.
Carlo Pedretti, 89, Italian historian (Leonardo da Vinci).
Sardar Ahmed Ali Khan Pitafi, 74, Pakistani politician, member of the Provincial Assembly of Sindh (2014–2017), cancer.
Marina Ripa di Meana, 76, Italian writer, stylist and TV personality, cancer.
Vassilios Sillis, 88, Greek Olympic athlete (1952, 1960).
Barry Thomas, 80, New Zealand rugby union player (Auckland, Wellington, national team).
Jerry Van Dyke, 86, American actor and comedian (My Mother the Car, The Dick Van Dyke Show, Coach), heart failure.
Peter Wells, 88, British-born New Zealand Olympic athlete (1952, 1956).
Gihan Wikramanayake, 57, Sri Lankan academic.
John Young, 87, American astronaut (Apollo 16, STS-1), pneumonia.

6
Horace Ashenfelter, 94, American athlete, Olympic champion (1952).
Remídio José Bohn, 67, Brazilian Roman Catholic prelate, Bishop of Cachoeira do Sul (since 2011).
Elza Brandeisz, 110, Hungarian dancer and teacher, conferred Righteous Among the Nations.
Max Collie, 86, Australian trombonist.
Rita Crocker Clements, 86, American political organizer, First Lady of Texas (1979–1983, 1987–1991), complications from Alzheimer's disease.
Walther Dürr, 85, German musicologist.
Marjorie Holt, 97, American politician, member of the US House of Representatives for Maryland's 4th District (1973–1987).
Rod Hunter, 74, Canadian curler, world champion (1970, 1971).
Bob Jenson, 86, American politician, member of the Oregon House of Representatives (1997–2015).
Elizabeth Meehan, 70, Scottish political scientist.
Kapil Mohan, 88, Indian beverage and food executive (Old Monk, Mohan Meakin), cardiac arrest.
William R. Ojala, 92, American politician, member of the Minnesota House of Representatives (1971–1974).
Peter Preston, 79, British journalist, editor of The Guardian (1975–1995), melanoma.
Baldev Raj, 70, Indian nuclear physicist.
Jimmy Robinson, 67, American recording engineer (Led Zeppelin).
Nigel Sims, 86, English footballer (Aston Villa, Wolverhampton, Peterborough).
Greta Thyssen, 90, Danish-born American actress (Quiz Whizz, Pies and Guys, Sappy Bull Fighters), pneumonia.
Dave Toschi, 86, American police detective (Zodiac Killer), pneumonia.
Frank Varrichione, 85, American football player (Pittsburgh Steelers, Los Angeles Rams).

7
Meshary Al-Arada, 35, Kuwaiti singer and composer, traffic collision.
Jim Anderton, 79, New Zealand politician, Deputy Prime Minister (1999–2002), MP (1984–2011) and Leader of the Progressive Party (2002–2012).
Ed Bennett, 80, American Olympic sailor.
Will Gay Bottje, 92, American composer.
Joe Ellis Brown, 84, American politician, member of the South Carolina House of Representatives (1986–2006).
Marley Caribu, 70, Japanese manga writer (Old Boy).
Shiv Chopra, 84, Canadian microbiologist and human rights activist.
Bryn Crossley, 59, Welsh jockey, seizure.
Tom Dowling, 77, American football coach (Georgetown Tigers, Liberty Flames), pancreatic cancer.
Noël Estcourt, 89, Rhodesian-born English rugby union player.
France Gall, 70, French singer ("Laisse tomber les filles", "Poupée de cire, poupée de son", "Ella, elle l'a"), Eurovision winner (1965), cancer.
Anna Mae Hays, 97, American military officer and nurse, Chief of Army Nurse Corps (1967–1971), first female U.S. General, complications from a heart attack.
Markku Into, 72, Finnish poet.
Tom Netherton, 70, American singer, pneumonia.
Nico, 56, Swiss western lowland gorilla.
Gustav Heiberg Simonsen, 82, Norwegian lawyer and politician.
Buster Stiggs, 63, British-born New Zealand drummer (Suburban Reptiles, The Swingers, Models), complications from kidney disease and multiple myeloma.
Antoni Subirà, 77, Spanish politician, member of Parliament of Catalonia (1980–1993) and co-founder of Democratic Convergence of Catalonia.
Peter Sutherland, 71, Irish barrister and banker, Attorney General (1981–1982, 1982–1984), founding Director-General of the World Trade Organization (1993–1995).
Chris Tsangarides, 61, British music producer (Black Sabbath, Judas Priest, Thin Lizzy), pneumonia and heart failure.
Bjørg Vik, 82, Norwegian writer, co-founder of Sirene.
Shrivallabh Vyas, 60, Indian actor (Lagaan).
Saksham Yadav, 28, Indian powerlifter, traffic collision.
Dick Young, 90, American baseball player (Philadelphia Phillies).
Doug Young, 98, American voice actor (Quick Draw McGraw, The Flintstones, Jonny Quest).

8
Hans Aabech, 69, Danish footballer (Skovshoved IF, national team).
Agustín Bernal, 59, Mexican actor.
Michael Hare, 2nd Viscount Blakenham, 79, British hereditary peer, company chairman (Pearson PLC), and environmentalist.
Salvador Borrego, 102, Mexican journalist and conspiracy theorist.
Bruce Cole, 79, American humanist, Chairman of the NEH (2001–2009), Presidential Citizens Medal recipient (2008).
Gerald Degaetano, 53, Maltese athlete.
Yvonne Englich, 38, German wrestler, cancer.
Juan Carlos García, 29, Honduran footballer (Marathón, Olimpia, national team), leukemia.
J. F. C. Harrison, 96, British historian and author.
Paddy Harte, 86, Irish politician, TD (1961–1997).
Claude Jean-Prost, 81, French Olympic ski jumper.
Jenny Joseph, 85, English poet.
Frank Kreith, 95, Austrian-born American mechanical engineer.
Denise LaSalle, 78, American blues singer ("Trapped by a Thing Called Love").
Vojtěch Lindaur, 60, Czech journalist, radio host (Radio Beat) and record producer.
George Lindbeck, 94, American Lutheran theologian.
James Makumbi, 75, Ugandan physician, politician and kidnap victim, MP and Minister of Health.
Keith McKenzie, 95, Australian VFL football player and coach (North Melbourne, Carlton Football Club).
Kynaston McShine, 82, American curator (MoMA).
Kapil Mohan, 88, Indian entrepreneur.
James N. Morgan, 99, American economist.
Antonio Munguía, 75, Mexican footballer (Club Necaxa, Cruz Azul, national team).
Chuck Murphy, 70, American prelate, bishop of the Anglican Mission in the Americas, brain cancer.
Jackie Perry, 93, English rugby league footballer (Wakefield Trinity).
Donnelly Rhodes, 80, Canadian actor (Soap, Battlestar Galactica, Da Vinci's Inquest), cancer.
George Maxwell Richards, 86, Trinidadian politician, President (2003–2013), heart failure.
Myron Rush, 96, American Kremlinologist, Cornell University professor, and CIA analyst, kidney failure.
Wojciech Rydz, 85, Polish Olympic fencer (1952).
David Sherwin, 75, British screenwriter (if...., O Lucky Man!, Britannia Hospital), sepsis.
Ron Tandberg, 74, Australian cartoonist, oesophageal cancer.
Charles H. Turner, 82, American attorney.
Tricia Walker, 53, British author, breast cancer.

9
Bob Bailey, 75, American baseball player (Montreal Expos, Pittsburgh Pirates, Los Angeles Dodgers).
Stan Bronson Jr., 89, American baseball batboy.
Neave Brown, 88, American-born British architect, lung cancer.
Theodore V. Buttrey Jr., 88, American numismatist.
Maruja Callaved, 97, Spanish television director.
Dreaming of Anna, 14, American racehorse, ruptured aorta.
Guan De, 85, Chinese aeroelasticity engineer and aircraft designer.
Brandon Hixon, 36, American politician, member of the Idaho House of Representatives (2012–2017), suicide by gunshot.
Nicolas Hoffmann, 77, Luxembourgian footballer 
Heikki Kirkinen, 90, Finnish historian.
Terence Marsh, 86, British production designer (Doctor Zhivago, Oliver!, The Shawshank Redemption), Oscar winner (1966, 1969), cancer.
Valeri Matyunin, 57, Russian footballer (Dynamo Moscow, Dnepr Mogilev, Fakel Voronezh).
Jean-Marc Mazzonetto, 34, French rugby union player (Stade Montois), traffic collision.
Cheikh Sidy Mokhtar Mbacké, 93, Senegalese religious chief, Caliph of Mouride (since 2010).
Vladimír Miko, 74, Slovak table tennis player.
Joseph Wayne Miller, 36, American actor (Heavyweights).
Robert Minlos, 86, Russian mathematician.
Gerald Morkel, 76, South African politician, Premier of the Western Cape (1998–2001), Mayor of Cape Town (2001–2002).
Odvar Nordli, 90, Norwegian politician, Prime Minister (1976–1981), prostate cancer.
Yılmaz Onay, 80, Turkish author.
Kato Ottio, 23, Papua New Guinean rugby league footballer (national team), complications from heat stroke.
Mario Perniola, 76, Italian philosopher.
Ted Phillips, 84, English footballer (Ipswich Town, Leyton Orient, Colchester United), dementia.
Victoriano Ríos Pérez, 87, Spanish politician, member (1987–1999, 2003–2004) and president (1987–1995) of the Parliament of the Canary Islands, Senator (1995–2003).
Milton J. Rosenberg, 92, American psychology professor (University of Chicago) and radio host (WGN), pneumonia.
Reza Sheikholeslami, 76, Iranian academic.
Archie Styles, 78, English footballer (Wrexham, Stourbridge).
Kurt Thalmann, 86, Swiss footballer (FC Basel).
Alexander Vedernikov, 90, Russian singer and teacher, Bolshoi Theatre soloist (1958–1990), People's Artist of the USSR (1976).
Yuan Chengye, 93, Chinese organic chemist.

10
Rocky Agusta, 67, Italian race car driver.
Damdinjavyn Bandi, 75, Mongolian Olympic boxer (1972, 1976).
Victor Brooke, 3rd Viscount Alanbrooke, 85, British peer.
Étienne Bally, 94, French Olympic sprinter (1948, 1952), European champion (1950).
Eddie Clarke, 67, British guitarist (Motörhead, Fastway), pneumonia.
Charles Davis, 90, American Olympic sports shooter (1972).
Mikhail Derzhavin, 81, Russian actor.
Urs Fankhauser, 74, Swiss Olympic rower (1968, 1972).
Sir Angus Farquharson, 82, British public servant, Lord Lieutenant of Aberdeenshire (1998–2010).
David Fisher, 88, British television writer (Doctor Who, Dixon of Dock Green, Hammer House of Horror).
Pierre Grillet, 85, French footballer (RC Paris).
Gordon Hølmebakk, 89, Norwegian publishing editor.
John Sherrill Houser, 82, American artist, heart failure.
William B. Keene, 92, American judge (Los Angeles County Superior Court) and television personality (Divorce Court).
Katherine Kellgren, 48, American narrator and actress, cancer.
Tommy Lawrence, 77, Scottish footballer (Liverpool, Tranmere Rovers, national team).
Tom Luken, 92, American politician, member of the U.S. House of Representatives for Ohio's 1st and 2nd Districts (1974–1975, 1977–1991), Mayor of Cincinnati (1971–1972).
Philippe Marchand, 78, French politician, Deputy (1978–1991), Minister of the Interior (1991–1992).
John McGlashan, 50, Scottish footballer (Millwall, Peterborough, Rotherham).
Novello Novelli, 87, Italian actor (The Pool Hustlers, Dear Goddamned Friends).
Doreen Tracey, 74, English-born American actress (The Mickey Mouse Club), cancer and pneumonia.
*Celestine Ujang Jilan, 70, Malaysian politician, Speaker of the Sarawak State Legislative Assembly (1981–1987).
Gordon Wills, 83, English footballer (Notts County, Leicester City).

11
Doug Barnard Jr., 95, American politician, member of the U.S. House of Representatives from Georgia's 10th district (1977–1993).
Gene Cole, 89, American athlete, Olympic silver medalist (1952).
Raúl Antonio García, 55, Salvadoran footballer (Águila), lymphoma.
Stephane Gauger, 48, Vietnamese-born American film director and screenwriter (Owl and the Sparrow, Powder Blue), stroke.
Geoffrey C. Hazard Jr., 88, American lawyer.
John W. Hennessey Jr, 92, American academic.
Ednyfed Hudson Davies, 88, Welsh politician, MP for Conway (1966–1970) and Caerphilly (1979–1983).
Jeremy Inkel, 34, Canadian electronic music programmer and keyboardist, complications from asthma.
Sumiko Iwao, 83, Japanese psychologist, editor-in-chief of Japan Echo (1997–2007).
Edgar Ray Killen, 92, American Ku Klux Klan leader and convicted murderer.
Noemi Lapzeson, 77, Argentinian dancer and choreographer.
Takis Loukanidis, 80, Greek footballer (Doxa Drama, Panathinaikos, national team).
Jan Valentin Sæther, 73, Norwegian painter and priest.
Giuseppe Secchi, 86, Italian footballer (Triestina, Udinese Calcio, A.C. Fanfulla 1874).
Noel Thornton, 74, Australian rugby league player (Western Suburbs Magpies, Cronulla-Sutherland Sharks).

12
Rudy Árias, 86, Cuban baseball player (Chicago White Sox).
Peter Batkin, 65, English auctioneer, stroke.
Eddy Beugels, 73, Dutch cyclist.
Lisa Chedekel, 57, American journalist, cancer.
Bella Emberg, 80, British actress (The Russ Abbot Show, The Benny Hill Show, Bear Behaving Badly).
Frankie Muse Freeman, 101, American civil rights attorney.
Robert W. Hamilton, 86, American legal scholar.
Keith Jackson, 89, American sportscaster (ABC Sports, Wide World of Sports).
Jean-Louis Koszul, 97, French mathematician.
Jim McNally, 86, American Olympic sports shooter.
Ilkka Pastinen, 89, Finnish diplomat.
Pierre Pincemaille, 61, French organist, lung cancer.
Léon Ritzen, 78, Belgian footballer (R.W.D. Molenbeek, Beerschot, national team).
Doodhnath Singh, 81, Indian writer, prostate cancer.
Sir Keith Speed, 83, British politician, MP (1968–1974, 1974–1997), Navy Minister (1979–1981).
John V. Tunney, 83, American politician, member of the U.S. House of Representatives from California's 38th district (1965–1971) and U.S. Senator (1971–1977), prostate cancer.
Heinrich von Stietencron, 84, German indologist.

13
Shaukat Abbas, 71, Pakistani cricketer.
Dean Allen, 51, Canadian typographer and web developer.
Bob Beak, 92, British Anglican prelate, Assistant Bishop of Marsabit (1984–1989).
Greg Critser, 63, American writer, glioblastoma.
Kaj Czarnecki, 81, Finnish Olympic fencer (1960).
Hélder d'Oliveira, 83, Portuguese Olympic sailor.
John Elder, 85, Australian football player.
Otoniel Gonzaga, 75, Filipino opera singer.
Doug Harvey, 87, American Hall of Fame baseball umpire.
Mohammed Hazzaz, 72, Moroccan footballer (MAS Fez).
Darmanto Jatman, 75, Indonesian poet.
Emmett Johns, 89, Canadian Roman Catholic priest.
Rick Jolly, 71, British Royal Navy surgeon.
Byron Langley, 91, American politician.
Jack Nel, 89, South African cricketer.
Tzimis Panousis, 63, Greek singer, comedian and actor, heart attack.
Jean Porter, 95, American actress (Abbott and Costello in Hollywood, Bathing Beauty, Cry Danger).
Julio Rocha López, 67, Nicaraguan football administrator, President of the Nicaraguan Football Federation (1987–2012) and UNCAF (2003–2017).
Aristeidis Roubanis, 85, Greek Olympic basketball player and javelin thrower (1952).
Ernest H. Sanders, 99, German-born American music historian.
Tad Schnugg, 73, American theater director.
Walter Schuster, 88, Austrian alpine skier, Olympic bronze medalist (1956).
Emily Anne Staples, 88, American politician, member of the Minnesota Senate (1977–1981).
Naomi Stevens, 92, American actress (Vega$, The Apartment, Valley of the Dolls).
Eliyahu Winograd, 91, Israeli judge.

14
Geoffrey Best, 89, English historian.
Barbara Cope, 67, American rock 'n' roll groupie, house fire.
Sir John Cullen, 91, British chemical engineer.
Paul Lustig Dunkel, 74, American flutist and conductor.
Pablo García Baena, 96, Spanish poet.
Dan Gurney, 86, American Hall of Fame racing driver (All American Racers), race car constructor (Eagle Mk1), and team owner (Eagle), pneumonia.
George Haines, 96, American basketball player.
Cecil Hoekstra, 82, Canadian ice hockey player (Montreal Canadiens).
Stan Hovdebo, 92, Canadian politician.
Bill Hughes, 87, American jazz trombonist.
Satnam Singh Kainth, 56, Indian politician, brain hemorrhage.
Max Labovitch, 93, Canadian ice hockey player (New York Rangers).
Erling Mandelmann, 82, Danish photographer.
Spanky Manikan, 75, Filipino actor, lung cancer.
Mario Martinez, 60, American weightlifter, Olympic silver medalist (1984).
François Morel, 91, Canadian composer.
Yosuke Natsuki, 81, Japanese actor (Storm Over the Pacific, Ghidorah, the Three-Headed Monster, The Return of Godzilla), kidney cancer.
John Pierik, 68, Dutch Olympic shooter (1980, 1984).
T. V. Rajeswar, 91, Indian police officer. Director of the Intelligence Bureau (1980–1983).
Anton Regh, 77, German footballer (1. FC Köln).
Cyrille Regis, 59, English footballer (West Bromwich Albion, Coventry City, Aston Villa), cardiac arrest.
Samuel A. Schreiner Jr., 96, American writer.
Milton Shadur, 93, American federal judge, U.S. District Court for the Northern District of Illinois (1980–1992).
Marlene VerPlanck, 84, American jazz singer.
Hugh Wilson, 74, American screenwriter and director (WKRP in Cincinnati, Police Academy, The First Wives Club), lung cancer and emphysema.

15
Romana Acosta Bañuelos, 92, American public servant, Treasurer of the United States (1971–1974), pneumonia.
Viktor Anpilov, 72, Russian politician and trade unionist, stroke.
Sir James Ball, 84, British economist.
Bob Barton, 76, American baseball player (San Diego Padres, San Francisco Giants), complications from dementia.
Anshel Brusilow, 89, American violinist and conductor.
Carl Emil Christiansen, 80, Danish footballer (Esbjerg fB).
Bogusław Cygan, 53, Polish footballer (Górnik Zabrze, Stal Mielec, Lausanne Sports).
Moussa Diagana, 71, Mauritanian writer.
Marianne Eigenheer, 72, Swiss artist.
Joe Frank, 79, French-born American radio personality (KPFA, KCRW, All Things Considered) and humorist.
Joachim Gnilka, 89, German Roman Catholic theologian.
Buddhadev Das Gupta, 84, Indian sarod player, heart attack.
Edwin Hawkins, 74, American gospel pianist and singer ("Oh Happy Day", "Lay Down (Candles in the Rain)"), multiple Grammy winner, pancreatic cancer.
Raghunath Jha, 78, Indian politician.
Dick King, 83, American politician, member of the Washington House of Representatives (1965–1994).
Mathilde Krim, 91, Italian-born American HIV/AIDS researcher.
Karl-Heinz Kunde, 80, German racing cyclist.
Samson Kutateladze, 53, Georgian politician and brigadier general, MP (2008–2012), shot.
Pitoy Moreno, 91, Filipino fashion designer.
Ava Mukherjee, 88, Indian actress (Devdas, Detective Naani).
Rosalia Nghidinwa, 65, Namibian politician, Minister of Immigration and Home Affairs (2005–2012) and Gender Equality and Child Welfare (2012–2015), cancer.
Wendy Nicol, Baroness Nicol, 94, British politician and life peer, member of the House of Lords (since 1983).
Omid Nooshin, 43, English director (Last Passenger).
Dolores O'Riordan, 46, Irish singer and guitarist (The Cranberries, D.A.R.K.), drowning due to alcohol intoxication.
Óscar Alberto Pérez, 36, Venezuelan actor, policeman and CICPC investigator, involved in Caracas helicopter incident, shot.
Roderick Rijnders, 76, Dutch coxswain, Olympic silver medalist (1968).
Gnani Sankaran, 64, Indian journalist and writer.
William Scharf, 90, American artist.
Mike Shanahan, 78, American professional sports team owner (St. Louis Blues).
Terje Skarsfjord, 75, Norwegian football manager (Tromsø).
Sujud Sutrisno, 64, Indonesian street drummer and singer.
Wilse B. Webb, 97, American psychologist and sleep researcher.
Peter Wyngarde, 90, British actor (Department S, Jason King, Flash Gordon).

16
Shammi Akhtar, 60, Bangladeshi playback singer, breast cancer.
Bill Bain, 80, American management consultant, founder of Bain & Company.
Joe Baker, 85, Australian marine scientist and rugby league player.
George Bandy, 72, American politician, member of the Alabama House of Representatives (since 1994), pulmonary and circulatory illness.
Arthur Davidson, 89, British politician, MP for Accrington (1966–1983), complications from a fall.
Rubén Oswaldo Díaz, 72, Argentine footballer (Racing Club, Atlético Madrid).
Bradford Dillman, 87, American actor (Compulsion, The Way We Were, The Enforcer), complications from pneumonia.
Geevarghese Divannasios Ottathengil, 67, Indian Syro-Malankala Catholic prelate, Bishop of Bathery (1996–2010) and Puthur (2010–2017).
Jørgen Dobloug, 72, Norwegian artist.
Ed Doolan, 76, Australian-born British radio presenter, complications of vascular dementia.
LaFayette Duckett, 99, American politician. 
Rodney Fern, 69, English footballer (Leicester City, Chesterfield), dementia.
Anatoly Glushenkov, 75, Russian politician, Governor of Smolensk Oblast (1993–1998).
Kingdon Gould Jr., 94, American diplomat, Ambassador to Luxembourg (1969–1972) and the Netherlands (1973–1976), pneumonia.
Peter Groeger, 84, German actor and director.
Tyler Hilinski, 21, American football player (Washington State), suicide by gunshot.
Dave Holland, 69, English drummer (Judas Priest, Trapeze).
Madalena Iglésias, 78, Portuguese actress and singer.
Oliver Ivanović, 64, Kosovar politician, shot.
Eugeniusz Jureczko, 78, Polish Roman Catholic prelate, Bishop of Yokadouma (1991–2017).
Liu Zhonghua, 101, Chinese navy admiral.
Julie Beth Lovins, 72, American computational linguist. 
Eric Luoma, 88, Canadian Olympic cross-country skier (1964).
Wilhelm Melliger, 64, Swiss equestrian, Olympic silver medalist (1996, 2000), stroke.
John Monteith, 69, American actor, writer and director.
Javiera Muñoz, 40, Swedish singer, anorexia nervosa.
Timothy J. O'Connor Jr., 81, American politician, member (1969–1981) and Speaker (1975–1981) of the Vermont House of Representatives.
Thomas Newman O'Neill Jr., 89, American federal judge, U.S. District Court for the Eastern District of Pennsylvania (1983–1996).
Moya O'Sullivan, 91, Australian actress (Neighbours, Cop Shop, Hey Dad..!).
Harold Rosen, 92, American politician, Mayor of Miami Beach, Florida (1974–1977).
John Spellman, 91, American politician, Governor of Washington (1981–1985), pneumonia.
Pål Spilling, 83, Norwegian computer scientist.
Jo Jo White, 71, American Hall of Fame basketball player (Boston Celtics, Golden State Warriors, Kansas City Kings), Olympic champion (1968), pneumonia.

17
Jahangir Amuzegar, 98, Iranian economist, academic and politician.
John M. Andrist, 86, American journalist and politician, member of the North Dakota Senate (1993–2014), complications from a stroke.
Roy Bennett, 60, Zimbabwean politician, MP (2000–2006), helicopter crash.
John Bindernagel, 76, Canadian biologist and cryptozoologist, cancer.
Landrum Bolling, 104, American political scientist and academic administrator, president of Earlham College (1958–1973).
Paul Booth, 74, American political activist.
Denis Cuspert, 41, German rapper and jihadist, airstrike.
Guy Dupré, 89, French writer and publisher.
Jessica Falkholt, 29, Australian actress (Home and Away, Harmony), injuries from a traffic collision.
Mark Genge, 90, English Anglican priest, Bishop of Central Newfoundland (1976–1990).
Jerzy Gros, 72, Polish Olympic long-distance runner (1976).
He Yousheng, 86, Chinese hydrodynamicist, member of the Academy of Engineering.
Edwin Lins, 54, Austrian Olympic wrestler (1984, 1988).
Ilir Luarasi, 63, Albanian footballer (Dinamo Tirana, national team).
Ted McCoy, 92, New Zealand architect.
Ed Moses, 91, American artist and painter.
Arno Motulsky, 94, German-born American geneticist.
Bénédicte Pesle, 90, French arts patron.
Augusto Polo Campos, 85, Peruvian composer.
Claude Prouvoyeur, 91, French politician, Senator (1983–1992), mayor of Dunkirk (1966–1989).
Herbert Schmertz, 87, American public relations executive.
Simon Shelton, 52, British actor (Teletubbies, Incredible Games), hypothermia.

18
Ishfaq Ahmad, 87, Pakistani nuclear physicist and professor (Abdus Salam Centre for Physics).
John Barton, 89, British theatre director, co-founder of the Royal Shakespeare Company.
Luc Beyer de Ryke, 84, Belgian politician, MEP (1980–1989), aortic rupture.
Bob Carlton, 67, British theatre director and writer (Return to the Forbidden Planet), cancer.
Martine Époque, 75, French-born Canadian dance educator and choreographer.
Eppie Gibson, 90, English rugby league player and coach (Whitehaven R.L.F.C.).
Wallis Grahn, 72, Swedish actress (Rederiet).
Ding Guangquan, 73, Chinese comedian.
Kashinath, 67, Indian actor and director (Anubhava, Avale Nanna Hendthi, Avane Nanna Ganda), cancer.
Chandi Lahiri, 88, Indian cartoonist.
Julius Lester, 78, American writer (To Be a Slave) and educator.
Lucas Mangope, 94, South African politician, President of Bophuthatswana (1977–1994).
Clara Marangoni, 102, Italian gymnast, Olympic silver medalist (1928).
Peter Mayle, 78, British author (A Year in Provence, A Good Year).
Laurie Morgan, 87, British government official, Chief Minister of Guernsey (2004–2007).
Steve Nisbett, 69, Nevisian-born British reggae drummer (Steel Pulse).
Nancy Richler, 60, Canadian novelist, cancer.
Edward C. Rochette, 90, American numismatist.
Anthony Allen Shore, 55, American serial killer and rapist, execution by lethal injection.
Henry Soles Jr., 82, American chaplain and author.
Borys Steklyar, 95, Ukrainian military officer.
Yasuo Tanaka, 86, Japanese astrophysicist.
Mae Tischer, 89, American politician.
Stansfield Turner, 94, American admiral, Director of Central Intelligence (1977–1981).
Joseph Wang Yu-jung, 86, Taiwanese Roman Catholic prelate, Bishop of Taichung (1986–2009).
Chick Webster, 97, Canadian ice hockey player (New York Rangers).
Barry Wilde, 89, Australian politician, member of the New South Wales Legislative Assembly for Parramatta (1976–1988).

19
Dik Abed, 73, South African-born Dutch cricketer.
Munnu Bhai, 84, Pakistani journalist.
Harvey R. Blau, 82, American attorney and executive.
Ute Bock, 75, Austrian educator and humanitarian.
Lin Bolen, 76, American television executive and producer.
James C. Browne, 83, American computer scientist.
Anna Campori, 100, Italian actress (Neapolitan Turk, The Overtaxed).
Geoffrey Caston, 91, British academic administrator and civil servant.
Olivia Cole, 75, American actress (Roots, Backstairs at the White House, Brewster Place), Emmy Award winner (1977), heart attack.
John Conboy, 83, American television producer (The Young and the Restless).
Maurice Couture, 91, Canadian Roman Catholic prelate, Archbishop of Québec (1990–2002).
Alain Devaquet, 75, French politician, Minister of National Education, Higher Education and Research (1986) and MP (1978–1981, 1988–1997).
Saqi Farooqi, 81, Pakistani poet.
Red Fisher, 91, Canadian hockey journalist (Montreal Star, Montreal Gazette).
Marcel Frémiot, 98, French composer and musicologist. 
Célio de Oliveira Goulart, 73, Brazilian Roman Catholic prelate, Bishop of São João del Rei (since 2010).
Pavel Kazankov, 91, Russian Olympic racewalker (1952).
David M. Knight, 81, British historian of science.
Ferdinand Knobloch, 101, Czech-Canadian psychiatrist.
Ed LaForge, 82, American politician, member of the Michigan House of Representatives (1994–2000), heart disease.
Dorothy Malone, 93, American actress (Written on the Wind, Peyton Place, Too Much, Too Soon), Oscar winner (1956).
Fredo Santana, 27, American rapper, kidney failure.
Allison Shearmur, 54, American film producer (The Hunger Games, Rogue One, Cinderella), complications from lung cancer.
Moose Stubing, 79, American baseball player (California Angels).
Lutho Tapela, Zimbabwean politician, Senator (2005–2013).
Sriniwas Tiwari, 93, Indian politician, Speaker of the Madhya Pradesh Legislative Assembly (1993–2003).
Barbara Weil, 84, American artist.
Leslie Wyche, 73, American community activist.

20
Dame Beulah Bewley, 88, British physician.
Paul Bocuse, 91, French chef, Parkinson's disease.
Wendell Castle, 85, American furniture designer and artist.
John Coleman, 83, American meteorologist, co-founder of The Weather Channel.
William Cousins, 90, American judge (Illinois Appellate Court), Chicago City Council member (1967–1976).
Terry Evans, 80, American blues and soul singer, songwriter and guitarist.
Naomi Parker Fraley, 96, American naval machinist, inspiration for the "We Can Do It!" poster.
Antonius Jan Glazemaker, 86, Dutch Old Catholic prelate, Archbishop of Utrecht (1982–2000).
Bill Johnson, 57, American baseball player (Chicago Cubs).
Jerry Keeling, 78, American-born Canadian football player (Calgary Stampeders, Ottawa Rough Riders, Hamilton Tiger-Cats).
Graeme Langlands, 76, Australian rugby league footballer (St. George Dragons, national team).
Howard Lew Lewis, 76, English comedian and actor (Brush Strokes, Maid Marian and Her Merry Men, Chelmsford 123).
Sylvester Carmel Magro, 76, Maltese Roman Catholic prelate, Apostolic Vicar of Benghazi (1997–2016).
Tracey Moore, 76, English cricketer (Norfolk, Minor Counties North, Minor Counties East), cancer.
Hasmukh Patel, 84, Indian architect.
William Rees, 89, British veterinarian, Chief Veterinary Officer (1980–1988).
Jim Rodford, 76, English bassist (Argent, The Kinks, The Zombies), injuries from a fall.
Doron Rubin, 74, Israeli military officer.
Harry Selby, 92, South African hunter.
Bob Smith, 59, American comedian (Funny Gay Males) and author, amyotrophic lateral sclerosis.
Miyako Sumiyoshi, 30, Japanese Olympic speed skater (2014).
Jack Whitten, 78, American artist.

21
Yves Afonso, 73, French actor (The Clockmaker, Weekend, One Deadly Summer).
Gianni Bongioanni, 96, Italian film director and screenwriter.
Chartchai Chionoi, 75, Thai boxer, WBC (1968–1969, 1970) and WBA World Flyweight Champion (1973–1974).
Khagen Das, 79, Indian politician, MP for Tripura West (2002–2004, 2004–2014), heart attack.
Bruno Giacosa, 88, Italian winemaker.
Philippe Gondet, 75, French footballer (Nantes, Red Star, national team).
Jock Haswell, 98, British military historian and intelligence officer.
Tsukasa Hosaka, 80, Japanese footballer (Furukawa Electric), pneumonia.
A. Dean Jeffs, 89, American politician. 
Jim Johannson, 53, American ice hockey player (Indianapolis Ice, Milwaukee Admirals) and executive (USA Hockey).
Jun Tae-soo, 33, South Korean actor (All My Love For You).
Lyle Mehrkens, 80, American politician, member of the Minnesota House of Representatives (1979–1982) and Senate (1983–1992).
Jens Okking, 78, Danish actor (The Kingdom, One-Hand Clapping) and politician, MEP (1999–2003).
Pasquale Panìco, 91, Italian politician, Senator (1979–1992).
David Pithey, 81, South African cricketer.
Jose Santos Rios, 78, Northern Mariana Island politician, Mayor of Saipan (1982–1986).
Connie Sawyer, 105, American actress (Dumb and Dumber, Pineapple Express, When Harry Met Sally...), heart attack.
Ken Seddon, 67, British chemist.
Michael Selby, 82, British-born New Zealand geomorphologist.
Paul Sun, 80, Taiwanese politician, Minister of Agriculture (1992–1996), pancreatic cancer.

22
Jimmy Armfield, 82, English football player (Blackpool, national team) and manager (Leeds United), world champion (1966), non-Hodgkin lymphoma.
K. B. Asante, 93, Ghanaian diplomat, Ambassador to Switzerland (1967–1972) and the European Economic Community (1976–1978).
Ian Bennett, 69, Canadian civil servant, President of the Royal Canadian Mint (2006–2014).
Carl Blair, 85, American painter and sculptor.
Andrew Carroll, 32, American ice hockey player (Idaho Steelheads, Minnesota-Duluth Bulldogs), suicide by jumping.
Shorty Castro, 89, Puerto Rican comedian, songwriter and entertainer, cancer.
Kudzai Chimbaira, 32, Zimbabwean actor.
Johnny Cowell, 92, Canadian trumpeter and arranger.
Peter Diversi, 85, Australian rugby league footballer (North Sydney Bears, Manly Warringah Sea Eagles).
Jack Doms, 91, New Zealand swimmer, British Empire and Commonwealth Games champion (1954).
Dale Engstrom, 100, American politician, member of the Tennessee House of Representatives (1970–1972).
Nolan Flemmer, 79, South African cricketer.
Emilio Gastón, 83, Spanish poet and politician, MP (1977–1979) and Justicia de Aragón (1987–1993).
Billy Hancock, 71, American musician.
Reinier Kreijermaat, 82, Dutch footballer (Feyenoord, USV Elinkwijk, Xerxes/DHC).
Ursula K. Le Guin, 88, American science fiction writer (A Wizard of Earthsea, The Left Hand of Darkness, The Dispossessed).
Ceylon Manohar, 73, Indian actor and playback singer ("Surangani").
William Joseph McDonough, 83, American banker, president of the Federal Reserve Bank of New York (1993–2003).
Dahiru Musdapher, 75, Nigerian justice, Chief Justice (2011–2012).
Preston Shannon, 70, American blues singer, songwriter and guitarist, cancer.
Kevin Tate, 74, New Zealand soil chemist.
Annie Young, 75, American politician, chronic obstructive pulmonary disease.

23
Anders Åberg, 72, Swedish sculptor and painter.
Mohammed Al-Mfarah, 72, Saudi Arabian actor.
Ruth Alas, 57, Estonian economist.
Henry Dalzell-Payne, 88, British army general.
Nepal Chandra Das, 73, Indian politician.
Robert Dowdell, 85, American actor (Stoney Burke, Voyage to the Bottom of the Sea).
Robert Kisanga, 84, Tanzanian judge.
Francisco Moreno Martínez, 86, Spanish cyclist.
Hugh Masekela, 78, South African jazz trumpeter ("Grazing in the Grass", "Bring Him Back Home") and composer ("Soweto Blues"), prostate cancer.
Nicanor Parra, 103, Chilean poet.
Marcelo Romo, 76, Chilean actor (Enough Praying).
Galen L. Stone, 96, American diplomat, Ambassador to Cyprus (1978–1981), lymphoma.
Ezra Swerdlow, 64, American film producer (Spaceballs, 21 Jump Street, Zombieland), complications from pancreatic cancer and ALS.
Sys NS, 61, Indonesian actor, director and politician, member of the People's Consultative Assembly (1999–2004).
Wyatt Tee Walker, 88, American civil rights activist and pastor.
Lari White, 52, American country singer ("Now I Know", "That's My Baby") and actress (Cast Away), peritoneal cancer.
Richard Woollacott, 40, British racehorse trainer, suicide.

24
Sergio Benedetti, 75, Italian art historian and curator.
Bill Budness, 74, American football player (Oakland Raiders).
Marcos Carvajal, 33, Venezuelan baseball player (Colorado Rockies, Florida Marlins), pneumonia.
Gonzalo Facio Segreda, 99, Costa Rican politician, Minister of Foreign Affairs (1970–1978), President of the Legislative Assembly (1953–1956), Ambassador to the United States (1956–1958, 1962–1966, 1990–1994).
Renaud Gagneux, 70, French composer.
Jack Ketchum, 71, American novelist (The Girl Next Door, Off Season) and screenwriter (Offspring), cancer.
Aleksandrs Kublinskis, 81, Latvian composer.
Krishna Kumari, 84, Indian actress (Pathala Bhairavi), bone marrow cancer.
Bruce Light, 68, Australian football player (Port Adelaide).
Sir Douglas Lowe, 95, British air chief marshal.
Warren Miller, 93, American ski and snowboarding filmmaker.
Julio Navarro, 82, Puerto Rican baseball player (Los Angeles Angels, Detroit Tigers, Atlanta Braves), complications from Alzheimer's.
Raymond Nimmer, 73, American legal scholar.
Pedro Pérez Fernández, 68, Spanish economist.
Matti Rissanen, 80, Finnish philologist.
Mark E. Smith, 60, English singer and songwriter (The Fall), lung and kidney cancer.
Jan Steeman, 74, Dutch comics artist (Roel Dijkstra, Noortje), kidney failure.
Attila Verestóy, 63, Romanian politician and chemical engineer, Senator (since 1990).

25
Claribel Alegría, 93, Nicaraguan poet.
Shawkat Ali, 81, Bangladeshi author.
Tommy Banks, 81, Canadian jazz pianist, composer and politician, Senator (2000–2011), Juno winner (1979), leukemia.
Hope Black, 98, Australian marine biologist.
Daniel M. Buechlein, 79, American Roman Catholic prelate, Archbishop of Indianapolis (1992–2011).
Walter Buckpesch, 93, German politician, Mayor of Offenbach am Main (1974–1980), MP (1983–1987).
W. P. C. Davies, 89, English rugby union player (Harlequins, national team, British and Irish Lions).
Neagu Djuvara, 101, Romanian historian, essayist and philosopher, pneumonia.
Dan Foster, 87, American medical researcher.
Steve Foster, 71, Australian singer-songwriter, lung cancer.
Arnaud Giovaninetti, 50, French actor.
Haripal Kaushik, 83, Indian field hockey player, Olympic gold medalist (1956, 1964), dementia.
Sabar Koti, 58, Indian singer.
Bill Logan, 83, American basketball player (Iowa Hawkeyes).
Patrick Mazimhaka, 69, Rwandan politician.
Floyd Miles, 74, American blues guitarist, singer and songwriter.
John Morris, 91, American film composer (The Elephant Man, Blazing Saddles, Dirty Dancing), respiratory infection.
Keith Pring, 74, Welsh footballer (Rotherham United, national team).
Lyudmila Senchina, 67, Russian singer.
Ghassan Shakaa, 74, Palestinian politician, Mayor of Nablus (1994–2004, 2012–2015).
Giuseppe Vitucci, 67, Italian Olympic wrestler (1976).
Cliff White, 72, British music journalist, cardiac arrest.
Graham Williams, 72, New Zealand rugby union player (Wellington, national team).

26
Shambhu Bhattacharya, 83, Indian actor.
Kendall Carly Browne, 99, American actress (Dreamscape, Alligator).
Buzz Clifford, 75, American singer ("Baby Sittin' Boogie") and songwriter, complications of influenza.
Raphael Cruz, 31, American acrobat and actor (Iris), heart and lung failure.
José Gabriel Diaz Cueva, 92, Ecuadorian Roman Catholic prelate, Bishop of Azogues (1968–1975).
Supriya Devi, 85, Indian actress (Meghe Dhaka Tara), heart attack.
Michael Gear, 83, British Anglican prelate, Bishop of Doncaster (1993–1999).
Elizabeth Hawley, 94, American journalist and Himalayan expedition historian.
Joe M. Haynes, 81, American politician, member of the Tennessee Senate (1985–2012).
Von G. Keetch, 57, American religious leader, General Authority of the LDS Church (since 2015).
Jacques Languirand, 86, Canadian radio host, writer and actor (Mars and April), Alzheimer's disease.
Jack Law, 93, Australian footballer (Footscray).
Alfred Léonard, 78, Belgian politician, MP (1985-1991), Mayor of Ferrières (1977–1992).
Hiromu Nonaka, 92, Japanese politician, member of the House of Representatives (1983–2003), Chief Cabinet Secretary (1998–1999).
Yukiaki Okabe, 76, Japanese swimmer, Olympic bronze medalist (1964), pneumonia.
John Salas, 70, Guamanian academic and politician, President of the University of Guam, member of the Legislature of Guam (1999–2003), complications of diabetes.
Francisco Savín, 88, Mexican conductor and composer (Xalapa Symphony Orchestra).
José Arturo Sierra, 72, Guatemalan judge, President of the Supreme Court (2013–2014), shot.
So Chau Yim-ping, 90, Hong Kong executive and politician.
Michael Wright, 105, Hong Kong architect, Director of Public Works (1963–69).
Cyrus Yavneh, 76, American producer (24, Supernatural, Nothing Sacred), lung cancer.
Isaiah Zeldin, 97, American Reform rabbi, founder of Stephen S. Wise Temple.
Igor Zhukov, 81, Russian pianist.

27
Robert McCormick Adams Jr., 91, American anthropologist.
Niki Bettendorf, 81, Luxembourgian politician, MP (1990–2006).
Fred van der Blij, 94, Dutch mathematician.
Jerry Butler, 58, American pornographic actor, cancer.
Barbara Calder, 93, British sailor, dementia.
Peter Casey, 82, Irish horse trainer.
Sir Alan Dawtry, 102, British local government official, chief executive of Westminster City Council (1956–1977).
Maryo J. de los Reyes, 65, Filipino director (Magnifico), heart attack.
Royal Galipeau, 71, Canadian politician, MP (2006–2015), multiple myeloma.
Alfred Hübler, 60, German-born American physicist, lymphoma.
Gurcharan Singh Kalkat, 91, Indian agricultural scientist.
Ingvar Kamprad, 91, Swedish retail furniture-home design executive and philanthropist, founder of IKEA, pneumonia.
Tomasz Mackiewicz, 42, Polish mountain climber.
Göran Nicklasson, 75, Swedish footballer.
Robert Parry, 68, American investigative journalist, complications of a stroke.
Edmundo Pedro, 99, Portuguese politician and political prisoner (Tarrafal camp), member of the Assembly of the Republic (1976–1980, 1983–1985, 1987–1991).
Dennis Peron, 72, American cannabis and LGBT activist, lung cancer.
Tadashi Sawashima, 92, Japanese film director (Shinsengumi), multiple organ failure.
Jerry Sneva, 68, American racing driver (CART).
Mereoni Vibose, 66, Fijian athlete.
Mort Walker, 94, American comics artist (Beetle Bailey, Hi and Lois, Boner's Ark), pneumonia.
John Wall, 85, British engineer and inventor (Crayford focuser).
Lawrence Weiskrantz, 91, British psychologist.

28
Hassa bint Mohammed bin Khalifa Al Nahyan, Emirati royal.
Bhanu Gupta, 87, Indian musician. 
Ernest Hawkins, 91, American football coach (East Texas State).
Hsu Hung-chih, 81, Taiwanese politician, Taoyuan County Magistrate (1981–1989), lung cancer.
Jacquie Jones, 52, American filmmaker, cancer.
Gennady Kazmin, 83, Russian politician.
Rolf Lacour, 80, German Olympic wrestler (1964, 1968, 1972), world championship silver medalist (1965).
Raymond Lory, 91, French politician.
Antônio Agostinho Marochi, 92, Brazilian Roman Catholic prelate, Bishop of Presidente Prudente (1976–2002).
József Merényi, 89, Hungarian Olympic speed skater (1952).
Maxwell Valentine Noronha, 91, Indian Roman Catholic prelate, Bishop of Calicut (1980–2002).
Dharmasena Pathiraja, 74, Sri Lankan film director and screenwriter.
Ettore Peretti, 59, Italian politician, Deputy (2006–2008), heart attack.
Robert Pincus-Witten, 82, American art critic, curator and art historian.
Jan Ramberg, 85, Swedish lawyer.
Dinesh Nandan Sahay, 81, Indian politician, Governor of Chhattisgarh (2000–2003) and Tripura (2003–2009).
Coco Schumann, 93, German jazz guitarist.
Ousmane Seck, 79, Senegalese politician, Minister of the Economy and Finance (1978–1983).
Gene Sharp, 90, American political scientist and nonviolence advocate.
Richard H. Tomlinson, 94, Canadian chemist and philanthropist.
Ignacio Verdura, 86, Argentine Olympic equestrian (1960).
Reg Webb, 70, British musician.
Sergei Yakhontov, 91, Russian linguist.

29
Paul Alcock, 64, English football referee, cancer.
José Aristegui, 89, Spanish Olympic rower.
John Bickersteth, 96, British Anglican prelate, Bishop of Bath and Wells (1975–1986).
Asmund Bjørken, 84, Norwegian jazz saxophonist, accordionist and bukkehorn player.
Ion Ciubuc, 74, Moldovan politician, Prime Minister (1997–1999).
Aga Syed Mohammad Fazlullah, 70, Indian Islamic scholar and cleric.
Alf Gooding, 85, Welsh executive (Catnic).
Vic Keeble, 87, English footballer (Colchester, Newcastle, West Ham).
Anthony Kemp, 78, English military historian.
Hilton McConnico, 74, American designer.
Rick McKay, 57, American filmmaker (Broadway: The Golden Age, by the Legends Who Were There).
Robert D. McWethy, 98, American submarine captain.
Jinadasa Niyathapala, 88, Sri Lankan politician.
Eddie Shaw, 80, American blues saxophonist, arranger and bandleader (Howlin' Wolf).
Stewart Sutherland, Baron Sutherland of Houndwood, 76, Scottish academic and life peer.
Jay Switzer, 61, Canadian television executive (Citytv), brain cancer.
Sir Cyril Taylor, 82, British educator.
*Clive van Ryneveld, 89, South African cricketer (national team).
Marek Wisła, 60, Polish Olympic sprint canoer (1980).
Ronald J. Wonnacott, 87, Canadian economist.

30
Bjørn Boysen, 74, Norwegian organist.
Sir Henry Brooke, 81, British lawyer and judge, Lord Justice of Appeal (1996–2006), complications from cardiac surgery.
Romano Cagnoni, 82, Italian photographer.
Ian R. Gibbons, 86, British biophysicist.
Andreas Gruschke, 57, German author and sinologist.
Hannah Hauxwell, 91, English farmer.
John W. Kern III, 89, American judge, complications from pneumonia and Alzheimer's disease.
Charles E. Lindblom, 100, American academic.
James McCray, 79, American opera singer and teacher.
Pat McLoughney, 68, Irish hurler (Offaly GAA).
Richard Murphy, 90, Irish poet.
Joaquín Rojas, 79, Filipino Olympic basketball player (1968). 
Mark Salling, 35, American actor (Glee) and musician, suicide by hanging.
Rolf Schafstall, 80, German football player and manager (MSV Duisburg, VfL Bochum, Bayer 05 Uerdingen).
Clyde Scott, 93, American football player (Philadelphia Eagles, Detroit Lions) and hurdler, Olympic silver medalist (1948).
Victor W. Sidel, 86, American physician.
Elisabeth Sveri, 90, Norwegian military officer.
Kevin Towers, 56, American baseball executive (San Diego Padres, Arizona Diamondbacks), thyroid cancer.
Chintaman Vanaga, 67, Indian politician, heart attack.
Terry Van Ginderen, 86, Belgian children's TV host (Kom Toch Eens Kijken), theatrical producer and music producer, pneumonia.
Azeglio Vicini, 84, Italian football player (Sampdoria) and manager (Udinese, national team).
Ron Walker, 78, Australian sports promoter, property developer and politician, Lord Mayor of Melbourne (1974–1976), melanoma.
Philip Woodward, 98, British mathematician and radar engineer.
Junji Yayoshi, 49, Japanese guitarist and record producer.
Louis Zorich, 93, American actor (Mad About You, Brooklyn Bridge, The Muppets Take Manhattan).

31
Dan Alon, 72, Israeli Olympic fencer (1972) and survivor of the Munich massacre, cancer.
Haradin Bala, 60, Kosovan war criminal, cancer.
Richard N. Berry, 102, American politician.
Piet Bleeker, 89, Dutch long-distance runner.
Pat Booth, 88, New Zealand investigative journalist (Arthur Allan Thomas case, Mr Asia crime syndicates).
Rasual Butler, 38, American basketball player (Miami Heat, New Orleans Hornets, Los Angeles Clippers), traffic collision.
Erwin de Vries, 88, Surinamese painter and artist.
Del Delker, 93, American gospel singer (Voice of Prophecy).
Alexander Dick, 95, Australian cricketer.
Gabriel Fackre, 91, American theologian.
Oscar Gamble, 68, American baseball player (New York Yankees, Cleveland Indians, Philadelphia Phillies), ameloblastic carcinoma.
Ann Gillis, 90, American actress (The Adventures of Tom Sawyer, Bambi, 2001: A Space Odyssey).
Haim Gouri, 94, Israeli poet.
Jack Halpern, 93, American chemist.
Elizabeth Hartley, 75, American archaeologist and curator.
Hennie Hollink, 86, Dutch football player and manager.
Alf Humphreys, 64, Canadian actor (My Bloody Valentine, First Blood, Diary of a Wimpy Kid), brain cancer.
Hwang Byungki, 81, South Korean gayageum player, pneumonia.
Itokin, 38, Japanese MC and track maker, lung cancer.
Leonid Kadeniuk, 67, Ukrainian first cosmonaut (STS-87).
Peter King, 5th Earl of Lovelace, 66, British peer.
Leah LaBelle, 31, Canadian-born American singer (American Idol), traffic collision.
Olavi Mäenpää, 67, Finnish politician.
István Marosi, 73, Hungarian Olympic handball player (1972).
John Fitzallen Moore, 89, American physicist.
William O'Connor, 47, American artist (Dungeons & Dragons, Magic: The Gathering).
Tadashi Sasaki, 102, Japanese engineer.

References

2018-01
 01